Sunil Kumar is an Indian politician and four times Member of Bihar Legislative Assembly, the incumbent member of the Bihar Legislative Assembly from Biharsharif seat. He contested 2005 Assembly Election as his first Assembly Election from the Biharsharif seat in Nalanda district  and defeated RJD leader Syed Naushadunnabi alias Pappu Khan. Kumar contested 2005 and 2010 Assembly Election on the ticket of Janata Dal (United); he joined BJP in June 2013 when JD(U) broke its 17 years old alliance with the BJP in Bihar in protest against the elevation of Narendra Modi as a head of the election campaign committee of BJP for 2014 Indian general election. He contested 2015 and 2020 Assembly Election on the ticket of Bhartiya Janta Party.

References 

Living people
Bihar MLAs 2005–2010
Bihar MLAs 2010–2015
Bihar MLAs 2015–2020
Bihar MLAs 2020–2025
Bharatiya Janata Party politicians from Bihar
Janata Dal (United) politicians
1957 births